B5 is the debut album by American R&B group B5. It was released on July 19, 2005, in the United States and has sold over 200,000 copies since its release. The album debuted and peaked at No. 19 on the Billboard 200, while peaking at No. 7 on the Billboard Top R&B/Hip-Hop Albums chart. The album spawned the single, "All I Do", a Jackson 5 cover, which peaked at No. 71 on the Hot R&B/Hip-Hop Songs chart.

Critical reception

AllMusic editor Andy Kellman wrote that "the group debuts with an album that employs an extremely lengthy list of songwriters and producers (including Rodney Jerkins, Ryan Leslie, and Corna Boyz), and the material they're given isn't much different than what you'd expect from young adolescents who'd rather entertain than shock. It's evident that they're talented and sound good together, but it'll take another album or two before they're able to prove themselves as more than just another boy group. This album should have no problem winning them a preteen fan base, and the parents of those fans will be thankful for the lack of a parental advisory sticker."

Track listing 
 "Let It Be" (The Beatles cover) – 0:57
 "U Got Me" – 3:27
 "Dance for You" – 3:57
 "So Pretty" – 3:36
 "All I Do" (Jackson 5 cover) – 3:45
 "Teacher's Pet" – 4:23
 "Let Me Know" – 3:33
 "Nothin 'Bout Me" – 3:18
 "Heartbreak" – 3:09
 "Back in Your Arms" – 3:13
 "No More Games" – 3:09
 "You Don't Know" – 3:47

Sample credits
"Back in Your Arms" contains samples from Michael Jackson's "I Wanna Be Where You Are"

Charts

References

2005 debut albums
B5 (group) albums
Bad Boy Records albums
Albums produced by Rodney Jerkins
Albums produced by Sean Garrett